Edward Peter Cullen (born March 15, 1933) is an American prelate of the Roman Catholic Church who served as bishop of the Diocese of Allentown in Pennsylvania from 1998 to 2009 and as an auxiliary bishop of the Archdiocese of Philadelphia from 1994 to 1997.

Biography

Early life and education
Cullen was born on March 15, 1933, to an Irish Catholic family in Philadelphia, Pennsylvania, to Edward Peter and Julia Catherine (née Leahy) Cullen. He was raised in the Yeadon section of Philadelphia, along with his older sister, Joan, and three younger brothers, Joseph, James, and John. Cullen attended West Philadelphia Catholic High School for Boys, where he played football, participated in track and field athletics and was involved in the school newspaper.  After school, Cullen worked as a cashier at an Acme Market.

Following his graduation from West Catholic, Cullen studied engineering at Drexel Institute of Technology in Philadelphia. In 1953, he entered St. Charles Borromeo Seminary in Overbrook, Pennsylvania, obtaining a Bachelor of Arts degree in 1958.

Ordination and ministry
On May 19, 1962, Cullen was ordained to the priesthood for the Archdiocese of Philadelphia by Archbishop John Krol in the Basilica of Saints Peter and Paul in Philadelphia. After his ordination, Cullen served as an assistant pastor at St. Maria Goretti Parish in Hatfield, Pennsylvania for three years, then went to St. Bartholomew Parish in Philadelphia.

Cullen was sent by Archbishop Krol to study at the University of Pennsylvania, earning his Master of Social Work degree in 1970. This was followed by a Master of Religious Education degree from La Salle University in Philadelphia (1971) and a Master of Divinity degree from St. Charles Borromeo Seminary (1974). From 1979 to 1993, Cullen served as a chaplain at St. Edmond's Home for Children in Bryn Mawr, Pennsylvania.

Cullen was raised by the Vatican to the rank of honorary prelate in April 1982, and served as director of Catholic Social Services from 1983 to 1988. In August 1988, Cullen was named vicar general of the archdiocese.

Auxiliary Bishop of Philadelphia
On February 8, 1994, Pope John Paul II appointed Cullen as an auxiliary bishop of the Archdiocese of Philadelphia and titular bishop of Paria in Proconsolare.  He received his episcopal consecration on April 14, 1994, from Cardinal Anthony Bevilacqua, with Archbishops John Foley and Francis Schulte serving as co-consecrators. Cullen selected as his episcopal motto: "Christ, Church, Compassion".

Bishop of Allentown
Pope John Paul II appointed Cullen as bishop of the Diocese of Allentown on December 16, 1997, replacing the retiring Bishop Thomas Welsh. Cullen was installed on February 9, 1998. In 2003, he was appointed to the board of trustees of The Catholic University of America.

In January 2004, Cullen stopped allowing the celebration of mass and other sacraments at The National Centre for Padre Pio in Barto, Pennsylvania, located in the diocese.  Cullen had previously expressed concern over the Centre's fundraising practices and lavish salaries for family members managing the Centre.  The Centre appealed Cullen's ruling to the Vatican, which rejected its appeal. In September 2020, Bishop Alfred A. Schlert lifted the sacrament ban on the Centre.  In 2008, Cullen carried out a so-called restructuring to largely eliminate ethic parishes in the Allentown Diocese. The diocese closed 47 parishes for a new total of 104 parishes. Some of the closed churches were then sold.

Retirement and legacy 
Cullen's letter of resignation as bishop of the Diocese of Allentown was accepted on May 27, 2009, by Pope Benedict XVI. At the same time, Pope Benedict named Monsignor John Barres as his replacement.

On August 14, 2018, Pennsylvania Attorney General Josh Shapiro released a grand jury report on the handling of sexual abuse allegations against priests in Pennsylvania.  The report showed that Cullen, as bishop of Allentown, instructed his vicar general, then Monsignor Alfred Schlert, to act as an "enabler" when handling abuse allegations. Shapiro said that Schlert and others earned promotions from Cullen for their work in handling the allegations. By the time the grand jury report was released, many records on sex abuse in the diocese were missing. The grand jury report involved six Pennsylvania dioceses, and it stated that "we believe that the real number — of children whose records were lost, or who were afraid ever to come forward — is in the thousands."

References

External links
The Diocese of Allentown: The Bishop
 Roman Catholic Archdiocese of Philadelphia
 Roman Catholic Diocese of Allentown

Episcopal succession

1933 births
Living people
American Roman Catholic clergy of Irish descent
Roman Catholic Ecclesiastical Province of Philadelphia
Roman Catholic Diocese of Allentown
Catholic University of America trustees
Roman Catholic bishops in Pennsylvania